Park Sung-hyun may refer to:

Park Sung-hyun (archer) (Hanja: 朴成賢, born 1983), South Korean archer
Park Sung-hyun (golfer) (Hanja: 朴城炫, born 1993), South Korean golfer